Cvijetin "Majo" Mijatović (8 January 1913 – 15 November 1993) was a Yugoslav communist politician who served as President of the Collective Presidency of Yugoslavia from 1980 until 1981.

Early life and career
Mijatović was born in Lopare, at the time in Austria-Hungary. In 1934, he became a member of the Communist Party of Yugoslavia (KPJ). Between 1934 and 1941 (except in 1938–1939 when he fulfilled Party duties in Bosnia and Herzegovina) he was a member of the University Committee of KPJ, instructor of the Regional Committee of KPJ for Serbia, and member of the city committee of KPJ for Belgrade.

After Yugoslavia was invaded in 1941, he participated in organizing armed battles in east Bosnia. He was a member of ZAVNOBiH since founding and AVNOJ since the second council.

After the liberation, he was Organisational Secretary of Communist League of Bosnia and Herzegovina, director of the High political school in Belgrade, chief editor of the newspaper "Komunist", ambassador of Yugoslavia to the USSR, member of the Central Committee of Communist League of Yugoslavia Bosnia and Herzegovina, secretary and the president of the Central Committee of Communist League of Bosnia and Herzegovina, member of the Presidency of Communist League of Yugoslavia and Chairman of the  Presidency of Yugoslavia.

Personal life
Mijatović's wife, actress Sibina Bogunović, died in a traffic collision on 22 June 1970. 

In 1973, he remarried, this time to actress Mira Stupica. 

From his first marriage, Mijatović had two daughters: Mirjana "Mira" (1961–1991) and Maja (1966–1991). Mira was a singer and member of the new wave band VIA Talas. Maja was an actress and television presenter, best known for hosting Nedjeljno popodne on TV Sarajevo.

References

External links

1913 births
1993 deaths
People from Lopare
People from the Condominium of Bosnia and Herzegovina
Serbs of Bosnia and Herzegovina
League of Communists of Bosnia and Herzegovina politicians
Presidents of the Socialist Federal Republic of Yugoslavia
Yugoslav Partisans members
Bosnia and Herzegovina atheists
Bosnia and Herzegovina people of World War II
Central Committee of the League of Communists of Yugoslavia members
Serbian people of World War II
Burials at Belgrade New Cemetery
Recipients of the Order of the People's Hero
Recipients of the Order of the Hero of Socialist Labour